General elections were held in Liechtenstein on 7 February 1993. Although the Patriotic Union won the most votes, the Progressive Citizens' Party won the most seats, whilst the Free List obtained representation in the Landtag the first time. Voter turnout was 87.54%. Fresh elections were subsequently held in October.

Results

References

Liechtenstein
1993 in Liechtenstein
1993 02
February 1993 events in Europe